This is a list of ambassadors of Sweden to Saudi Arabia.  The Swedish ambassador resides in Riyad and is the official representative of the Government in Stockholm to the Government of Saudi Arabia.  , the current ambassador is also accredited in Muscat (Oman) and in Sanaʽa (Yemen).

List of representatives

See also
List of ambassadors of Saudi Arabia to Sweden

References 

 
Saudi Arabia
Sweden